Friends and Romans is a 2014 American independent comedy film written and directed by Christopher Kublan and starring  Michael Rispoli, Annabella Sciorra, Paul Ben-Victor and Tony Sirico. It was awarded Best Narrative Feature and Best Cinematography at the 2014 Boston International Film Festival and Favorite Narrative Feature at the Napa Valley Film Festival.

Plot

Nick DeMaio, who has had small acting roles over the years, seeks to be more than just the Italian mob stereotype. When he is not successful getting an appropriate role from productions by others, he rents a Staten Island theater and puts together his own production of Julius Caesar, with the help of other actors he knows. What he doesn't know is that the theater owner, who auditions for and gets the role of Brutus, is the reclusive mobster the FBI has been investigating. Meanwhile, Nick's daughter Gina wants the lead role in Guys and Dolls at her school, but she gets it only because the drama teacher believes her father is a real mobster.

Cast  
 
 Michael Rispoli as  Nick DeMaio
 Annabella Sciorra as Angela DeMaio
 Paul Ben-Victor as Dennis Socio
 Katie Stevens as Gina DeMaio
  Charlie Semine as Paulie / Goldberg
 Anthony DeSando as Joey 'Bananas' Bongano
 Tony Sirico as Bobby Musso
 Tony Darrow as Frankie Fusso 
 Patrick Kerr as Mr. Rothman
 Christopher Kublan as Joey Two Chins
  Joseph D'Onofrio  as Big Vinnie
 Louis Vanaria as Tony Passioni
 Stephen Mailer as Principal Patten 
 John Buffalo Mailer as Schultz
 Jane Wells as Radio Newscaster
 Salena Qureshi as Linda

References

External links

2014 comedy films
American comedy films
American independent films
2014 independent films
2010s English-language films
2010s American films